Devi river is one of the principal distributaries of Mahanadi. It flows through Jagatsinghpur district and Puri district across Odisha state in India and joins Bay of Bengal.

Course 
The river forms the final part of a great network of Mahanadi river. Kathajodi river is the main southern distributary of Mahanadi river branching off at Cuttack, Odisha. Kathajodi river later acquires the name Devi as it flows further east. The river flows through Alipingal, Macchagaon and Naugaon blocks in Jagatsinghpur district and Astaranga and Kakatpur blocks in Puri district. The mouth of the river is surrounded by dense forests absent of inhabitants.

Navigation 
The river is navigable till Machgaon by small sloops. It is one of the best tidal channels in Orissa, but, yet big vessels can not enter the river upstream due to a large sediment of sand in the mouth of the river. Two fishermen were killed and two injured when a boat capsized near Astarang in the Devi River on 13 May 1988.

Turtle rookery 
The mouth of the Devi river serves as a nesting ground for olive ridley sea turtles   during their breeding season. The first rookery in this area north of Puri was discovered in 1981. Nesting occurs on mainland India and dynamic sand bars which appear and change forms from year to year. About 800,000 turtles come to this region every winter for breeding. However, the turtle nesting has declined in recent years due to mass death believed to be brought about by increased mechanised fishing. Over 6,000 olive ridleys were killed in year 2003 alone. According to a 2007 estimate, over 130,000 turtles have been found dead on these beaches over the previous 13 years. The effort to set aside the mouth of Devi River and Rushikulya River as sanctuaries for olive ridley turtles were opposed by local fishing communities.

Water Pollution

Devi_Kandal island people are suffering a lot due to the river water pollution of Devi & Kandal rivers caused due to the surge of huge amount of untreated drain water from Cuttack municipality region. On the other hand, both the rivers are being distributaries of Kathajodi river get very less water supply due to the obstruction of a concrete wall made on the mouth or initial points of both the rivers at Naraj. It is done for keeping more water reserved for industrial houses.

In such a situation lesser water flow largely polluted by nasty drain water of Cuttack city makes the water of both the rivers very poisonous. As a result, one can observe drastic reduction in many species of fishes and other water animals in these rivers. The fisherman community are worst suffering for the reason. Common man, who use the water for bathing, cleaning clothes and agriculture purposes are getting too little water for it and also getting affected by various water borne skin diseases & jaundice etc. The ground water level in the region drastically goes down in summers as it depends upon the level and quantity of water in these rivers.

References

External links 
 Mouth of Devi river in wikimapia

Rivers of Odisha
Tributaries of the Mahanadi River
Rivers of India